Anopsicus is a genus of cellar spiders that was first described by Ralph Vary Chamberlin & Vaine Wilton Ivie in 1938.

Species
 it contains sixty-four species, found in Central America, Cuba, Jamaica, and Mexico, with the exception of the "probably misplaced" A. banksi from the Galápagos Islands.:
A. alteriae Gertsch, 1982 – Mexico
A. banksi (Gertsch, 1939) – Ecuador (Galapagos Is.)
A. beatus Gertsch, 1982 – Mexico
A. bispinosus (Gertsch, 1971) – Mexico
A. bolivari (Gertsch, 1971) – Mexico
A. boneti Gertsch, 1982 – Mexico
A. bryantae Gertsch, 1982 – Jamaica
A. ceiba Gertsch, 1982 – Honduras
A. chiapa Gertsch, 1982 – Mexico
A. chickeringi Gertsch, 1982 – Panama
A. chiriqui Gertsch, 1982 – Costa Rica, Panama
A. clarus Gertsch, 1982 – Jamaica
A. concinnus Gertsch, 1982 – Costa Rica
A. covadonga Gertsch, 1982 – Mexico
A. cubanus Gertsch, 1982 – Cuba
A. davisi (Gertsch, 1939) – Mexico
A. debora (Gertsch, 1977) – Mexico
A. definitus Gertsch, 1982 – Honduras
A. elliotti (Gertsch, 1971) – Mexico
A. evansi (Gertsch, 1971) – Mexico
A. exiguus (Gertsch, 1971) – Mexico
A. facetus Gertsch, 1982 – Costa Rica
A. grubbsi Gertsch, 1982 – Mexico
A. gruta (Gertsch, 1971) – Mexico
A. hanakash (Brignoli, 1974) – Guatemala
A. iviei Gertsch, 1982 – Mexico
A. jarmila Gertsch, 1982 – Jamaica
A. jeanae (Gertsch, 1977) – Mexico
A. joyoa Gertsch, 1982 – Honduras
A. lewisi Gertsch, 1982 – Jamaica
A. limpidus Gertsch, 1982 – Jamaica
A. lucidus Gertsch, 1982 – Mexico
A. malkini Gertsch, 1982 – Mexico
A. mckenziei Gertsch, 1982 – Mexico
A. mirabilis Gertsch, 1982 – Mexico
A. mitchelli (Gertsch, 1971) – Mexico
A. modicus Gertsch, 1982 – Mexico
A. nebulosus Gertsch, 1982 – Jamaica
A. niveus Gertsch, 1982 – Mexico
A. nortoni Gertsch, 1982 – Jamaica
A. ocote Gertsch, 1982 – Mexico
A. palenque (Gertsch, 1977) – Mexico
A. panama Gertsch, 1982 – Panama
A. pearsei Chamberlin & Ivie, 1938 (type) – Mexico
A. pecki Gertsch, 1982 – Jamaica
A. placens (O. Pickard-Cambridge, 1896) – Mexico
A. potrero Gertsch, 1982 – Mexico
A. puebla Gertsch, 1982 – Mexico
A. pulcher (Bryant, 1940) – Cuba
A. quatoculus Gertsch, 1982 – Jamaica
A. quietus (Gertsch, 1973) – Guatemala
A. reddelli Gertsch, 1982 – Mexico
A. silvai Gertsch, 1982 – Cuba
A. silvanus Gertsch, 1982 – Belize
A. soileauae Gertsch, 1982 – Mexico
A. speophilus (Chamberlin & Ivie, 1938) – Mexico, Guatemala
A. tehuanus Gertsch, 1982 – Mexico
A. tico Huber, 1998 – Costa Rica
A. troglodyta (Gertsch, 1971) – Mexico
A. turrialba Gertsch, 1982 – Costa Rica
A. vinnulus Gertsch, 1982 – Mexico
A. wileyae Gertsch, 1982 – Mexico
A. zeteki (Gertsch, 1939) – Panama
A. zimmermani Gertsch, 1982 – Jamaica

See also
 List of Pholcidae species

References

Araneomorphae genera
Pholcidae
Spiders of Central America
Spiders of Mexico
Spiders of the Caribbean